Frank A. R. Mayer (April 24, 1895 – August 3, 1973) was an American football player and coach. He served as the head football coach at Macalester College in St. Paul, Minnesota from 1925 to 1929. Mayer was a standout player at the University of Minnesota, earning All-American honors in 1916.

Mayer worked as a reporter for the Minneapolis Daily News and the Minneapolis Journal. He practiced law in St. Paul during the time he coached at Macalester. During World War II, Mayer served as secretiary to Marvin L. Kline, the mayor of Minneapolis. He was later the public relations director for the North Central Association of Colleges and Schools. Mayer died on  August 3, 1973.

References

1895 births
1973 deaths
20th-century American journalists
American male journalists
20th-century American lawyers
American football tackles
American public relations people
Macalester Scots football coaches
Minnesota Golden Gophers football players
People from East Grand Forks, Minnesota
Coaches of American football from Minnesota
Players of American football from Minnesota
Journalists from Minnesota
Minnesota lawyers